Christiane Oelze (born 9 October 1963 in Cologne) is a German operatic soprano. From 2003 to 2008, she taught singing at the Robert Schumann Hochschule Düsseldorf. Since 2010 she taught at the Masterclass of Apeldoorn (Netherlands), since 2011 at the Musik Academy in Arosa and since 2012 at IRCAM in Paris.

Numerous opera performances, especially Mozart-roles, she sang in London (Covent Garden), Paris (Théâtre Garnier), in Glyndebourne, Hamburg (Hamburger Staatsoper) at the Salzburg Festival and Mozartwochen in Salzburg, the Mostly Mozart Festival in New York and at the Lucerne Festival.

2015 she had produced 70 CDs and DVDs. Her recording of the Mahler-symphony No. 4, arranged by Erwin Stein, was highlighted by the Preis der deutschen Schallplattenkritik in 2006, also 2016 her Schönberg-Stringquartets No. 2 and No. 4.  She is a jury-member of international contests.

References

External links 
 
 
 Robert Schumann Hochschule Düsseldorf
 Christiane Oelze (Soprano) Bach Cantatas Website
 

German operatic sopranos
1963 births
Living people
Musicians from Cologne
Academic staff of Robert Schumann Hochschule
20th-century German  women  opera singers
21st-century German   women opera singers